"I Could Use Another You" is a song written by Tom Shapiro, Chris Waters and Bucky Jones, and recorded by American country music artist Eddy Raven.  It was released in July 1984 as the second single and title track from the album I Could Use Another You.  The song reached #9 on the Billboard Hot Country Singles & Tracks chart.

Chart performance

References

1984 singles
1984 songs
Eddy Raven songs
Songs written by Tom Shapiro
Songs written by Chris Waters
Song recordings produced by Paul Worley
RCA Records singles
Songs written by Bucky Jones